Thriller! is a 1973 album by San Francisco funk group Cold Blood. Lydia Pense and the rest of Cold Blood were backed by The Pointer Sisters.

The album caused controversy because of its violent cover art. The cover was cited in 1978 in a congressional committee on domestic violence. The inside of the album cover, in the fold out, is the same model stabbing a man in the back.

Track listing
"Baby I Love You" (Jerry Ragovoy)
"You Are the Sunshine of My Life" (Stevie Wonder)
"Feel So Bad" (James Johnson, Leslie Temple)
"Sleeping" (Richard Manuel, Robbie Robertson)
"Live Your Dream" (Max Haskett)
"I'll Be Long Gone" (Boz Scaggs)
"Kissing My Love" (Bill Withers)

"Feel So Bad" originally credited Chuck Willis as songwriter in error on the sleeve.

Personnel
Cold Blood
Lydia Pense - vocals
Michael Sasaki - electric and acoustic guitars
Raul Matute - keyboards
Max Haskett - trumpet, backing vocals
Skip Mesquite - flute, saxophone, backing vocals
Peter Weller - trumpet, flugelhorn
Rod Ellicott - bass
Gaylord Birch - drums, percussion
Additional personnel
Mel Martin - baritone and tenor saxophone, flute
Bill Atwood - trumpet, flugelhorn
Bob Ferreira - tenor saxophone, flute
Pat O'Hara - trombone
John Mewborn - valve trombone, trumpet
Bennie Maupin - tenor saxophone, bass clarinet
Mike Andress - tenor saxophone
Rigby Powell - trumpet
Holly Tigard, Pointer Sisters - backing vocals
Technical
Fred Catero, Jeremy Zatkin - engineer
David Rubinson - remix engineer

References

1973 albums
Cold Blood (band) albums
Albums produced by Dave Rubinson
Reprise Records albums
Albums recorded at Wally Heider Studios